"Pretty Mama Blues" is a 1948 song written and performed by Ivory Joe Hunter.  Hunter's second release was his first number one on the US Billboard R&B chart.  "Pretty Mama Blues' spent three weeks at the number one spot.

References 
 

1948 singles
Songs written by Ivory Joe Hunter